Tsapiky  is a musical genre popular in southwest Madagascar, particularly in the former Toliara Province. It was created as a fusion between South African pop (originally picked up from Mozambican radio stations) and native Malagasy tradition in the 1970s. The music is characterized by its jerky rhythms and fast beat. The song sees popularity in the contexts of sports events, night clubs, balls, celebrations, and funerals.
Common instrumens in tsapiky include: guitar, electric guitars, bass, drums, accordions, synthesizers, and vocals (usually provided by a choir of women).

Although initially consisting of solely acoustic instruments, in the 1980s, tsapiky also integrated electric guitars.

Festivals
Tsapiky festivals primarily occur in urban centers, such as Toliara. These festivals last for several days to a week, and consist of several concerts play for hours, supposedly inducing trance-like states from audience members. Rather than come alone, entire families come along, bearing gifts.

References

See also and further reading
 Salegy
 Music of Madagascar

Malagasy musical styles
African music genres
African popular music
Popular music